East Poinsett County School District (EPCSD) is a public school district based in Lepanto, Arkansas, United States. The school district encompasses  of land, including portions of Poinsett County and Mississippi County.

Poinsett County incorporated communities in the district include Lepanto and Tyronza, Unincorporated counties in the county and in the district include Rivervale.

The district proves comprehensive education for pre-kindergarten through grade 12 and is accredited by the Arkansas Department of Education (ADE).

History 
The district was formed on July 1, 1986, when the Lepanto and Tyronza school systems consolidated. The high school sports team, the Lepanto Panthers, became the EPC Warriors.

Schools 
 Secondary schools
 East Poinsett County High School, located in Lepanto and serving more than 300 students in grades 7 through 12.
 Elementary schools
 Lepanto Elementary School, located in Lepanto and serving more than 200 students in pre-kindergarten through grade 2.
 Tyronza Elementary School, located in Tyronza and serving more than 225 students in pre-kindergarten and in grades 4–6.

References

Further reading
 (Download) - Includes boundaries of the Lepanto and Tyronza districts

External links 
 

School districts in Arkansas
Education in Poinsett County, Arkansas
Education in Mississippi County, Arkansas
1986 establishments in Arkansas
School districts established in 1986